"You're the One for Me, Fatty" is a single by Morrissey released in July 1992. It was taken from the then-unreleased Your Arsenal album and was the second Morrissey single to be co-written with Alain Whyte and produced by glam rock legend Mick Ronson. The title is a pun on the Marvelettes' song "You Are the One for Me, Bobby". The track reached number 19 on the UK Singles Chart.

Critical reception
This single was retrospectively described by Ned Raggett in AllMusic as "[a] smart, lively cut...with the overall title and overall mood still being as classically Morrissey as it gets." Raggett did not think the B-sides were as strong in comparison but still "fine enough numbers, further evidence as to how the Your Arsenal sessions had re-energized [Morrissey]." Raggett concludes his review, writing, "The tone throughout is relaxed and fun, almost in spite of some of the lyrics".

Track listings
All lyrics were written by Morrissey. All music was composed by Alain Whyte except where noted.

Personnel
 Morrissey – vocals
 Alain Whyte – guitar
 Boz Boorer – guitar
 Gary Day – bass guitar
S pencer Cobrin – drums

Charts

References

Morrissey songs
1992 singles
1992 songs
Songs written by Alain Whyte
Rockabilly songs
Songs written by Morrissey